The Red Room is a Swedish novel by August Strindberg that was first published in 1879. A satire of Stockholm society, it has frequently been described as the first modern Swedish novel. In this novel, Strindberg reflects his own experiences of living in poverty while writing this novel during February to November 1879. While receiving mixed reviews in Sweden, it was acclaimed in Denmark, where Strindberg was hailed as a genius. As a result of The Red Room, Strindberg became famous throughout Scandinavia.  Edvard Brandes wrote that it "makes the reader want to join the fight against hypocrisy and reaction."

A young idealistic civil servant, Arvid Falk, leaves the drudgery of bureaucracy to become a journalist and author. As he explores various social activities—politics, publishing, theatre, philanthropy, and business—he finds more hypocrisy and political corruption than he thought possible. He takes refuge with a group of "bohemians", who meet in a red dining room in Berns Salonger to discuss these matters.

An English translation by Ellie Schleussner, translator of several other works by Strindberg, was published in 1913 in London and is now in the public domain. There is also a 2009 translation by Peter Graves.

American literary critic John Albert Macy (husband of Anne Sullivan) wrote in his The Critical Game (published in 1922):

Adaptations

The novel was adapted into a comic book by Per Demervall.

References

External links
 
 

1879 Swedish novels
Novels by August Strindberg
Roman à clef novels
Novels set in Stockholm
Swedish-language novels
Swedish satirical novels
Novels adapted into comics